Hammarby IF Rugby are an amateur Swedish rugby union team founded in the year 2000, currently competing in the Allsvenskan (Top Swedish league).

In this short period of time the club has produced a number of Swedish national team players in both the XV team as well as in Sevens.

Notable players include Kanogo Njuru, an outside centre, who in the year 2002 played for the Barbarians.

References

External links
Hammarby IF Rugby

Swedish rugby union teams